Drillia captiva is a species of sea snail, a marine gastropod mollusk in the family Drilliidae.

Description
The length of the shell attains 21 mm, its diameter 6.5 mm.

The pale shell has a short fusiform shape. The spire is elongate and acuminate. It shows a pale band above the middle of the whorl. The shell contains about 10 whorls, The others are slightly concave above the suture and then slightly convex or almost flat. The whorls are crossed by 14-16 oblique longitudinal ribs. Very fine spiral striae, crossed by equally fine lines of growth, are observable under a powerful lens. The oblique aperture has an irregular shape. The siphonal canal is short. The outer lip is varicose and strongly sinuate at its top. The columella is almost straight and has a thin callus.

Distribution
This species occurs in the demersal zone off the Andaman Islands.

References

  Tucker, J.K. 2004 Catalog of recent and fossil turrids (Mollusca: Gastropoda). Zootaxa 682:1–1295

External links

captiva
Gastropods described in 1899